The 1946 Connecticut gubernatorial election was held on November 5, 1946. Republican nominee James L. McConaughy defeated Democratic nominee Charles Wilbert Snow with 54.38% of the vote.

General election

Candidates
Major party candidates
James L. McConaughy, Republican
Charles Wilbert Snow, Democratic

Other candidates
Jasper McLevy, Socialist
Herman N. Simon, Socialist Labor

Results

References

1946
Connecticut
Gubernatorial